Paulo Otávio Rosa da Silva (born 23 November 1994), commonly known as Paulo Otávio, is a Brazilian footballer who currently plays as a left back for Bundesliga club VfL Wolfsburg.

Career
On 11 June 2019, VfL Wolfsburg announced that they had signed Otávio on a 4-year contract.

Career statistics

Club

Notes

References

External links

Profile at the VfL Wolfsburg website

1994 births
Living people
People from Ourinhos
Brazilian footballers
Brazilian expatriate footballers
Association football defenders
Club Athletico Paranaense players
Coritiba Foot Ball Club players
Esporte Clube Santo André players
Paysandu Sport Club players
Tombense Futebol Clube players
LASK players
FC Ingolstadt 04 players
VfL Wolfsburg players
2. Liga (Austria) players
Brazilian expatriate sportspeople in Austria
Expatriate footballers in Austria
Bundesliga players
2. Bundesliga players
Footballers from São Paulo (state)